Lifeboat is a 2018 documentary short film about North African migrants trying to make it across the Mediterranean Sea safely.

Accolades
Nominated: Academy Award for Best Documentary (Short Subject) - 91st Academy Awards
Nominated: Best Short - IDA Documentary Awards 2018
Nominated: Outstanding Current Affairs Documentary - 40th News and Documentary Emmy Awards

References

External links

Lifeboat at The New Yorker

2018 films
American documentary films
Documentary films about refugees
2010s English-language films
2010s American films
Works originally published in The New Yorker